Dominic Penaloza is a Chinese-Filipino entrepreneur and investor who was born and raised in Toronto, Canada. He was the CEO & founder of Ushi, a Chinese professional network based in Shanghai. He was the CEO and founder of WorldFriends, a social networking service for internationally minded people, with offices in Shanghai and Tokyo and partnered with Yahoo Japan. He has received several awards including the Ivey Emerging Leaders Award. He was the Chief Innovation & Technology Officer at naked Hub, a company that was acquired by WeWork for USD 400 million. At WeWork China he was the Head of Innovation & Technology. After leaving WeWork in early 2020, he started REinvent, Asia's first proptech startup studio as CEO and cofounder. One of REinvent's ventures is Switch, a workspace on-demand platform.

References 

Year of birth missing (living people)
Living people
Canadian chief executives
Canadian people of Filipino descent
Canadian people of Chinese descent
Chinese people of Filipino descent
Businesspeople from Toronto